Arsen Marjan (born 20 October 1975) is a Serbian former professional footballer who played as a defender.

Career
After starting out at his hometown club Dinara, Marjan joined Belgrade-based club Milicionar. He subsequently played with Zvezdara and helped them win promotion to the First League of FR Yugoslavia in the 2000–01 season, before moving abroad to Cyprus in 2002. After one season abroad, Marjan returned to Serbia and Montenegro, spending the next three years playing for Železnik, Beograd, Radnički Beograd, and Zeta. He moved abroad for the second time in early 2006, joining Greek club Panserraikos. While in Greece, Marjan also played for Ilisiakos, Fostiras, and Anagennisi Karditsa.

Honours
Zvezdara
 Second League of FR Yugoslavia: 2000–01

References

External links
 

Anagennisi Karditsa F.C. players
Apollon Limassol FC players
Association football defenders
Cypriot First Division players
Expatriate footballers in Cyprus
Expatriate footballers in Greece
First League of Serbia and Montenegro players
FK Beograd players
FK Milicionar players
FK Palilulac Beograd players
FK Radnički Beograd players
FK Železnik players
FK Zeta players
FK Zvezdara players
Football League (Greece) players
Fostiras F.C. players
Panserraikos F.C. players
Sportspeople from Knin
Serbia and Montenegro expatriate footballers
Serbia and Montenegro expatriate sportspeople in Cyprus
Serbia and Montenegro footballers
Serbian expatriate footballers
Serbian expatriate sportspeople in Greece
Serbian footballers
Serbs of Croatia
1975 births
Living people